Brentford and Isleworth is a constituency represented in the House of Commons of the UK Parliament. It forms the eastern part of the London Borough of Hounslow. Since 2015, it has been represented by Ruth Cadbury of the Labour Party.

Boundaries

1974–1983: The London Borough of Hounslow wards of Clifden, Gunnersbury, Homefields, Hounslow Central, Hounslow South, Isleworth North, Isleworth South, Riverside, Spring Grove, and Turnham Green.

1983–1997: The above wards as renamed: Brentford Clifden, Chiswick Homefields, Chiswick Riverside, Gunnersbury, Hounslow Central, Hounslow South, Isleworth North, Isleworth South, Spring Grove, and Turnham Green.

1997–2010: As above plus Hounslow West.

2010–present: Wards in the same borough: Brentford, Chiswick Homefields, Chiswick Riverside, Hounslow Central, Hounslow Heath, Hounslow South, Isleworth, Osterley and Spring Grove, Syon, and Turnham Green.

Constituency profile
The seat is a mixture of very suburban London and urban district centres with many differing heights and types of homes. It stretches along the north bank of the Thames and then to the west, encompassing the London districts (former villages) of Chiswick, most of Hounslow, Isleworth (from Old Isleworth to Osterley) and the former market town of Brentford.

The seat is affluent nearest the Thames and Osterley Park, yet it has a few tall tower blocks and other council housing set back from it in parts of Isleworth and Brentford. Brentford has a wide range and long history of social housing, which is mostly, by a narrow margin, private housing, following the 1980s Right to Buy reform. Locally, 21st century development includes a large proportion of shared ownership and housing authority homes. The seat has seen more unemployment (11.7% in 2017) than London (5.3%) or the UK (4.4%) overall.

About three wards make up Hounslow in the west, and two for Brentford in the centre, which, excluding its expensive Quay and North Quarter parts, have an above-average rank in the Index of Multiple Deprivation; many of these homes are affordable for workers on lower incomes, and are generally strong for the Labour Party. In the far east of the seat are three Chiswick wards that return Conservative councillors. Chiswick's large public sector economic component, and relatively young profile for a wealthy area sees a three-way or broader split in its general election votes. The only part of the seat with a London postcode - W4, it abounds with high-income office workers, small-to-mid-size business directors and senior governmental workers. Its parks, gardens, long Thames riverside, proximity to Hammersmith, united Piccadilly and District tube lines and housing stock mean it resembles the neighbouring Richmond Park seat socio-economically. The wards of Osterley, Spring Grove and Hounslow South have long alternated between, or generated a split result between, Conservative and Labour councillors, and there is no evidence to suggest they lean more to the left of their local results at general elections.

The Liberal Democrats (including their two predecessor parties) took their largest share of the vote here in 2010, but they have lacked local councillors, and the party received less than a quarter of the vote in what was essentially a three-candidate race.

The Green Party kept its deposits in three of the four contests before 2017. In the election that year it chose not to field a candidate, in order to help Labour defend its 400-vote majority.

Economy
Brentford FC's Griffin Park ground is within the seat, as is Fuller's Brewery, and various headquarters of multinational and market-leading domestic companies, including GlaxoSmithKline and BSkyB. The districts have tube or rail services to the east and west of London (to Heathrow Airport, Ealing and/or Weybridge), which are major centres of employment.

Political history (summary)
From 1979 until 2015, the seat proved to be a national bellwether. The 2015 result gave the seat the 4th most marginal majority of Labour's 232 seats by percentage of majority. During the seat's existence, the two largest parties nationally have jostled for the winning candidate. In 2015, Labour gained the seat, despite the Conservatives winning a majority nationally, thus ending its streak as a bellwether constituency.

Split of votes in local council elections

In 2010, council seats split evenly (15—15) between the two main parties, reflecting the result of the general election held on the same day, in which the parliamentary seat was narrowly gained by the Conservatives. From 1998 to 2001, three wards at the centre of the constituency returned Independent Community Group councillors, reaching seven seats at their peak. These wards were taken by Labour in 2010.

Labour added Hounslow South in 2014, and took one of the three Osterley and Spring Grove seats, leaving them with 19 seats and the Conservatives with 11. In 2018, Labour gained the remaining Conservative seats in Osterley and Spring Grove, which gave Labour 21 seats to the Conservatives on 9.

Members of Parliament
The constituency was created in 1974, mostly replacing the former seat of Brentford and Chiswick.

Election results

Elections in the 2010s

Elections in the 2000s

Elections in the 1990s

Elections in the 1980s

Elections in the 1970s

See also
 List of parliamentary constituencies in London

Notes

References

External links
 nomis Constituency Profile for Brentford and Isleworth — presenting data from the ONS annual population survey and other official statistics.
Politics Resources (Election results from 1922 onwards)
Electoral Calculus (Election results from 1955 onwards)

Parliamentary constituencies in London
Politics of the London Borough of Hounslow
Constituencies of the Parliament of the United Kingdom established in 1974
Brentford, London
Isleworth